Whalleyana is an enigmatic genus of moths in the lepidopteran group Obtectomera, endemic to Madagascar. The genus contains two species, whose biology are unknown. The genus had been placed in the picture-winged leaf moths, (Thyrididae), but then was placed in its own family (Minet, 1991), and later elevated to its own superfamily (Dugdale et al., 1999: 229-230); see also Fänger (2004). The genus was named after Paul E. S. Whalley, a British entomologist. Genomic studies have found them to be most closely related to Callidulidae, and it is suggested that they should be placed in Calliduloidea.

References

Dugdale, J.S., Kristensen, N.P., Robinson, G.S. and Scoble, M.J. (1999). The non-Glossatan Moths. Ch. 13, pp. 217–233  in Kristensen, N.P. (Ed.). Lepidoptera, Moths and Butterflies. Volume 1: Evolution, Systematics, and Biogeography. Handbuch der Zoologie. Eine Naturgeschichte der Stämme des Tierreiches / Handbook of Zoology. A Natural History of the phyla of the Animal Kingdom. Band / Volume IV Arthropoda: Insecta Teilband / Part 35: 491 pp. Walter de Gruyter, Berlin, New York.
Fänger, H.. 2004. Comparative morphology of tergal phragmata occurring in the dorsal thoraco-abdominal junction of ditrysian Lepidoptera (Insecta). Zoomorphology, 119 (3): 163-183.pdf
Minet, J. (1991). Tentative reconstruction of the ditrysian phylogeny (Lepidoptera: Glossata). Entomologica Scandinavica, 22: 69-95.

Sources
Firefly Encyclopedia of Insects and Spiders, edited by Christopher O'Toole, 2002

External links
Tree of Life
Wikispecies

Obtectomera
Ditrysia genera
Taxa named by Pierre Viette